Ken "Kim" Hansen is a Democratic Party member of the Montana Senate who represented District 17 from 2003 to 2010.

External links
Montana Senate – Ken Hansen official MT State Legislature website
Project Vote Smart – Senator Kenneth 'Kim' Hansen (MT) profile
Follow the Money – Ken Hansen
2008 2006 2002 campaign contributions

Democratic Party Montana state senators
1951 births
Living people
People from Havre, Montana
People from Blaine County, Montana